Taevion Kinsey (born March 10, 2000) is an American college basketball player whose career with the Marshall Thundering Herd of the Sun Belt Conference (SBC) recently ended. He was named the 2023 Sun Belt Conference Player of the Year.

High school career
Kinsey attended Eastmoor Academy in Columbus, Ohio. As a junior, he was named Division II District Player of the Year. In his senior season, Kinsey averaged 19.5 points per game, earning Division II All-State second team honors. He committed to playing college basketball for Marshall over offers from Kent State, Indiana State and UNC Asheville, among others.

College career
On January 12, 2019, Kinsey scored a freshman season-high 23 points and seven rebounds in a 70–69 win over Western Kentucky. He led Marshall to the CollegeInsider.com Tournament championship, posting 21 points and 11 rebounds in a 90–70 victory over Green Bay in the title game on April 4. As a freshman, Kinsey averaged 10.5 points and four rebounds per game. He was a two-time Conference USA Freshman of the Week and was named to the All-Freshman Team. On November 21, Kinsey recorded 14 points and 14 assists in a 91–63 win over Howard. On January 16, 2020, he tallied a sophomore season-high 29 points and 11 rebounds in a 77–75 loss to Charlotte. He averaged 16.4 points, five rebounds and 4.2 assists per game as a sophomore, earning Second Team All-Conference USA honors. On December 3, 2020 Kinsey recorded a career-high 31 points and seven rebounds in an 80–64 victory over Wright State. He averaged 19.5 points, 6.2 rebounds and 3 assists per game during his junior season. Kinsey was hampered by a leg injury as a senior but was named to the Second Team All-Conference USA.

On November 17, 2022, Kinsey surpassed the 2,000 point milestone, scoring 14 points in a win over Miami (OH). At the conclusion of the regular season, he was named Sun Belt Conference Player of the Year. In a quarterfinal loss in the 2023 Sun Belt tournament, Kinsey became the all-time leading scorer in Marshall history, passing Jon Elmore.

Career statistics

College

|-
| style="text-align:left;"| 2018–19
| style="text-align:left;"| Marshall
| 37 || 13 || 24.8 || .587 || .357 || .667 || 4.0 || 1.3 || .8 || .5 || 10.5
|-
| style="text-align:left;"| 2019–20
| style="text-align:left;"| Marshall
| 32 || 32 || 36.0 || .490 || .264 || .682 || 5.0 || 4.2 || 1.1 || .4 || 16.4
|-
| style="text-align:left;"| 2020–21
| style="text-align:left;"| Marshall
| 22 || 22 || 37.7 || .532 || .413 || .818 || 6.2 || 3.0 || .8 || .3 || 19.5
|- class="sortbottom"
| style="text-align:center;" colspan="2"| Career
| 91 || 67 || 31.8 || .529 || .335 || .718 || 4.9 || 2.7 || .9 || .4 || 14.8

Personal life
Kinsey's older sister, Tajanee Wells, played college basketball for Ursuline College.

References

External links
Marshall Thundering Herd bio

2000 births
Living people
American men's basketball players
Basketball players from Columbus, Ohio
Marshall Thundering Herd men's basketball players
Shooting guards